Look East may refer to:

 Look East policy (disambiguation)
 BBC Look East, a regional television news programme for the East of England